The Lakland Decade is a dual-pickup, solid-body electric bass guitar made by Chicago-based Lakland Musical Instruments.  

Released in 2004 to celebrate the company's 10th anniversary, the U.S.-made Decade is available in a variety of configurations.   The mid-priced Skyline series is constructed of a mahogany body, maple neck, and rosewood fingerboard and equipped with Lakland's Chi-Sonic pickups.

See also

 Lakland Musical Instruments

References

External links

 Lakland Company Website

Guitars